Gayny is the name of several rural localities in Russia:
Gayny, Perm Krai, a settlement in Gaynsky District of Perm Krai
Gayny, Sverdlovsk Oblast, a village in Achitsky District of Sverdlovsk Oblast